The 1940 Vermont gubernatorial election took place on November 5, 1940. Incumbent Republican George Aiken did not run for re-election to a third term as Governor of Vermont, instead running for the United States Senate. Republican candidate William H. Wills defeated Democratic candidate John McGrath to succeed him.

Republican primary

Results

Democratic primary

Results

General election

Candidates
William H. Wills (Republican), Lieutenant Governor of Vermont
John McGrath (Democratic), state senator, milk farmer, businessman and nominee for U.S. Senate in 1938

Results

References

Vermont
1940
Gubernatorial
November 1940 events